A helicopter hauldown and rapid securing device (HHRSD) or beartrap enables helicopters to land on and depart from smaller ships in a wide range of weather conditions. Similar devices are referred to as RAST and TRIGON.

The beartrap was developed in response to the difficulties encountered when attempting to land larger helicopters from smaller ships. Until the hazard was effectively addressed, it was impractical to conduct such operations, thus multiple navies looked into various methods of easing ship-based landings under adverse conditions. During the late 1950s, the Royal Canadian Navy refitted the frigate  with an experimental flight deck with the prototype beartrap; it underwent successful testing with Sikorsky HO4S-3 and Sikorsky H-34 helicopters. A second series of trials onboard  during the early to mid-1960s led to the beartrap being cleared for operational use with the Royal Canadian Navy during April 1967. The Sikorsky CH-124 Sea King was the first Canadian helicopter to operationally use this landing system.

Other navies promptly introduced this technology, or similar counterparts. The Royal Navy and the United States Navy were early adopters after the Royal Canadian Navy's positive experience. The system is not only used by helicopters, but also for the retrieval of unmanned aerial vehicles (UAVs). It continues to routinely used, largely unchanged since its original development, into the twenty-first century.

History
By the mid-1950s, many navies around the world were in the process of introducing ship-based all-weather helicopters to perform a variety of functions, from logistical support to anti-submarine warfare. However, a common difficulty that was encountered was a practical means of landing helicopters, particular larger ones, on a flight deck of a ship that was either rolling or pitching. This unfavourable motion was particularly bad during poor weather conditions or when attempting to lander on smaller vessels. While roll-dampening fins and other measures were soon regularly implemented upon ships both new and old, this approach did not remove this difficulty, only lessening it somewhat. At the time, some considered it to be simply impractical under any circumstance to operate large helicopters in this manner.

Starting in the 1950s, the Royal Canadian Navy, which had encountered the same challenge in its early helicopter operations, undertook investigations into new methods of resolving the issue. The Navy's Experimental Squadron 10 (VX 10), based at Shearwater, was undertaking the practical work associated with this initiative. Early work had involved the refitting of the frigate  with a compact experimental flight deck, after which a series of successful flight trials were performed, initially using a Sikorsky HO4S-3 helicopter and later with a larger Sikorsky H-34. It was on the basis of these trials that the operation of helicopters from Canadian destroyers was first given approval.

The initial version of the beartrap, as installed on HMCS Buckingham, was reengineered by the Dartmouth-based company Fairey Aviation. The redesigned apparatus was first installed upon  during a conversion performed between 1962 and 1963. In late 1963, trials with a newly-acquired Sikorsky CH-124 Sea King began; during the following year, after the completion of day-time trials, the new system, which involved no manhandling of the helicopter on the deck or to get it in or out of the hangar, was concluded to be a success. One early issue that was quickly resolved was the occasional snapping of the cable. Accordingly, the service had developed the world's first helicopter hauldown and rapid securing device (HHRSD), or beartrap.

In April 1967, the beartrap was cleared for service, having been deemed suitable for both day and night operations to 30 degrees of roll and nine degrees of pitch up to Sea State 6. The CH-124 Sea King was the first Royal Canadian Navy helicopter to be operationally equipped with this system. Canada's Sea King replacement, the Sikorsky CH-148 Cyclone, which entered service in June 2015, is also outfitted to work with the beartrap.

The beartrap was subsequently adopted by numerous navies around the world, including the United States, the United Kingdom, Australia, and Japan. Some navies refer to the device as the Recovery Assist, Secure and Travers (RAST), or TRIGON. While other navies have operated a range of different helicopters aboard their escort ships, a broadly similar system is used, involving a probe or grappling device lowered on a steel cable into a flight deck grating, before winching itself down while secured to the deck of a pitching vessel in heavy seas. The beartrap remains in common use into the twenty-first century. The system has also been used to assist in the landing of unmanned aerial vehicles.

Function
Typical use of the beartrap involves a helicopter hovering over the landing pad on the deck and lowering a line with an attached probe on the end. This probe is attached by the deck crew to a heavier cable that passes through the center of the beartrap from a winch below the flight deck. The cable is pulled back up and secured to the helicopter. The pilot then increases power to balance the pull of the winch with the lift of the helicopter. This arrangement synchronizes the helicopter with the ship's movements and puts the helicopter in the "high hover" position. As the pilot decreases the power, the helicopter is slowly pulled by the winch to the "low hover" position just above the deck while maintaining sync with the ship.

The rate of pull applied by the winch is under the direct control of the landing safety officer (LSO), who can opt to increase or decrease the helicopter's descent based on moment-by-moment conditions. Constant tension is intentionally maintained on the cable via an automatically-adjusting hydraulic system connected with multiple high-sensitivity tension sensors, and a shock absorption system. Fail-safes are incorporated into the device as well. When the LSO determines that a relatively quiet moment is approaching, he instructs the pilot to land. The beartrap is then "closed" to capture the helicopter's main probe, securing the aircraft to the flight deck. The tail is secured by a second probe. A typical beartrap landing takes five minutes from approach to being fully secured on the deck.

Once the helicopter is secured and straightened, the beartrap is then used to move the aircraft in and out of the hangar. One advantage of this arrangement is it permits movement in and out of the hangar under more severe conditions than if the helicopter were to have been towed in a more conventional manner. In fact, conventional deck handling of the landed helicopter posed some risk, manhandling lacked both speed and consistency, thus there was the possibility that an unfortunate helicopter could end up falling off the ship - the bear trap reduced this risk considerably.

References

External links
 Canadian innovation on display: The "Beartrap" - via skiesmag.com
 

Canadian inventions
Royal Canadian Navy